Air Lanka Flight 512 was an Air Lanka (now SriLankan Airlines) flight from London Gatwick Airport via Zurich and Dubai to Colombo (Bandaranaike International Airport) and Malé, Maldives (Velana International Airport). On 3 May 1986, the Lockheed L-1011 Tristar operating the flight was on the ground in Colombo, about to fly on to Malé, when an explosion ripped the aircraft in two, destroying it. The flight carried mainly French, West German, British and Japanese tourists; 21 people were killed on the aircraft, including 3 British, 2 West German, 3 French, 2 Japanese, 2 Maldivian, and 1 Pakistani. 41 people were injured.

Boarding of the flight had been delayed due to the aircraft being damaged during cargo / baggage loading. During boarding, a bomb, hidden in the aircraft's 'Fly Away Kit' (a collection of small spare parts), exploded.  The bomb had been timed to detonate mid-flight; the delay likely saved many lives.

The Sri Lankan government concluded that the bomb was planted by the Liberation Tigers of Tamil Eelam (LTTE) to sabotage peace talks between the LTTE and the Sri Lankan government. They reported that a search of the aircraft the next day uncovered a parcel containing uniforms with the insignia of the Black Tigers, the suicide wing of LTTE.

See also
Air Ceylon Avro 748 4R-ACJ bombing 
Lionair Flight 602

References 

1986 murders in Sri Lanka
Accidents and incidents involving the Lockheed L-1011
Airliner bombings
Attacks on civilians attributed to the Liberation Tigers of Tamil Eelam
Aviation accidents and incidents in 1986
Massacres in Sri Lanka
Improvised explosive device bombings in Sri Lanka
Liberation Tigers of Tamil Eelam attacks against airliners
Liberation Tigers of Tamil Eelam attacks in Eelam War I
Mass murder in 1986
Mass murder of Sinhalese
May 1986 crimes
May 1986 events in Asia
SriLankan Airlines accidents and incidents
Terrorist attacks on airports
Terrorist incidents in Sri Lanka in 1986